Millatu Ibrahim is an organization outlawed in Germany. The group's leader is Mohamed Mahmoud (also known as Abu Usama Al-Gharib) who emigrated to Egypt in April, 2012. Another senior member is former rapper Deso Dogg and Fadi Mohammad El kurdi (also known as Abu Mohammad Al Almani) and Michael Nowak(Also known as Abu Dawud Al Almani)The group has sided with jihadists in the Syrian civil war. The name of the organization is of Quranic origin.

Founding
Millatu Ibrahim was founded in the fall of 2011, in a "backyard mosque" in Solingen; the group has around 50 members.

Banning in Germany
On May 29, 2012, Germany's Interior Minister declared a ban on the Millatu Ibrahim organization "because of efforts against the constitutional order" and cited incidents where the group turned to violence. The group has called for further violence.

Australian branch
A branch of the Millatu Ibrahim organization has been established in Australia, Islamic preacher Mohammed Junaid Thorne is a notable member; but when questioned by the media, Thorne stated that the two groups share the same name but are not otherwise connected.

References

Islamic organisations based in Germany
Islamic terrorism in Germany
Islamic State of Iraq and the Levant and Germany
Salafi Jihadist groups